The 1920 Navy Midshipmen football team represented the United States Naval Academy during the 1920 college football season. In their first season under head coach Bob Folwell, the Midshipmen compiled a 6–2 record, shut out three opponents, and outscored all opponents by a combined score of 164 to 43.

The annual Army–Navy Game was played on November 27 at the Polo Grounds in New York City; Navy

Schedule

References

Navy
Navy Midshipmen football seasons
Navy Midshipmen football